KUCW (channel 30) is a television station licensed to Ogden, Utah, United States, broadcasting the CW network to Salt Lake City and the state of Utah. It is owned and operated by network majority owner Nexstar Media Group alongside ABC affiliate KTVX (channel 4). Both stations share studios on West 1700 South in Salt Lake City, while KUCW's transmitter is located atop Farnsworth Peak in the Oquirrh Mountains.

KUCW has a large network of broadcast translators that extend its over-the-air coverage throughout Utah, as well as portions of Nevada and Wyoming.

History
There are two methods of accounting for the station's history: by license and by "intellectual unit" which is the combination of a station's call letters, programming, network affiliation, and staff. As the result of local marketing agreements struck in 1998, which launched a process that culminated in a station swap in 1999, KUCW's license history differs from its intellectual unit history prior to April 21, 1998.

License history
On May 24, 1983, the FCC granted an original construction permit to build a full-power television station on UHF channel 30 to serve the city of Ogden and the Salt Lake City market. The new station, owned by Ogden Television Inc., originally identified under its application number (830121KH) but took the call letters KOOG-TV in September 1985. It first signed on the air on October 7 and was licensed on January 16, 1986. Originally, the station maintained a general entertainment format airing cartoons, classic movies, drama series and classic sitcoms. In early 1986, the station began airing Home Shopping Network programming during the overnight hours, before expanding the network's programming to the midday hours in mid-1987. By 1988, KOOG was carrying HSN programming eighteen hours a day and general entertainment programming for six hours a day.

Ogden Television Inc. went into receivership in 1993 and the station was sold to the Miracle Rock Church in a deal finalized in March 1994. Ogden Television was programming approximately eight hours of general entertainment programs per day while Miracle Rock Church added about an hour per day of religious programming to the schedule and continued to air HSN approximately fifteen hours a day. On January 11, 1995, KOOG became a charter affiliate of The WB, which initially only carried prime time programming on Wednesday evenings (Sunday primetime shows were added nine months later). The following September, it also added cartoons from Kids' WB. Paxson Communications (now Ion Media Networks), having recently failed to complete an agreement to acquire 50% of KZAR-TV (channel 16, later KUWB and now KUPX-TV) in Provo, agreed to acquire KOOG in 1996 and the station dropped HSN in favor of Paxson's inTV infomercial network. The sale was finalized in June 1997 and the station continued to air programming from The WB. Almost immediately, Paxson began pursuing a television station swap with KZAR, which was at the time wholly owned by Roberts Broadcasting. The swap proposal was documented in an August 1997 transfer of control agreement between Roberts Broadcasting and ACME Communications.

At the same time, Paxson was involved in a dispute with Sonic Cable Television of Utah trying to secure must-carry coverage on Sonic's system in Logan. Paxson filed a complaint with the FCC at the end of December but their petition was unsuccessful. In February 1998, KOOG became KUPX airing inTV during the daytime, WB programming during prime time, and The Worship Network overnight. On April 20, 1998, Paxson entered into an agreement with Roberts Broadcasting and ACME Communications in which each station would acquire the other's assets but WB programming would remain on channel 30. To expedite the process, the parties immediately entered into local marketing agreements whereby the stations would swap call signs and would begin to operate each other's stations until the FCC could approve the assignments of license. The following day, the stations executed the LMAs. KUPX channel 30 in Ogden became KUWB, while KUWB channel 16 in Provo became KUPX. Paxson continued to own the Ogden station that was now KUWB, but operated the new Provo station, KUPX. Meanwhile, Roberts and ACME continued to own KUPX, but operated KUWB.

Upon assuming operations at KUWB, ACME dropped the infomercial and religious programming and replaced it with classic television series. Paxson, Roberts and ACME filed a formal assignment of license applications in May 1998 and the FCC approved the swap in March 1999. In September 1999, ACME (having bought out Roberts Broadcasting's interests) and Paxson consummated the agreement and took full ownership of their respective stations. In time, KUWB began to cut back on cartoons and classic sitcoms, and eventually eliminated them altogether in favor of court shows, daytime talk and reality shows. Afternoon cartoons disappeared in January 2006 when The WB ended the weekday afternoon Kids' WB block. In August 2005, Clear Channel Communications (owner of KTVX) reached an agreement to buy KUWB from ACME Communications. The sale, completed in April 2006, gave Clear Channel a duopoly in the Salt Lake City market.

On January 24, 2006, the Warner Bros. unit of Time Warner and CBS Corporation announced that the two companies would shut down The WB and UPN and combine the networks' respective programming to create a new "fifth" network called The CW. KUWB's sale to Clear Channel became contingent on the ability of the station to secure the CW affiliation. In April, Clear Channel announced plans to affiliate KUWB with The CW, and nearly two weeks later, CW and KUWB announced the official affiliation agreement. As a result, the sale of the station was able to be completed.

In February 2006, Clear Channel obtained the KUCW call letters and placed them on a Coos Bay, Oregon satellite of KMTR in Eugene, Oregon in anticipation of the acquisition of KUWB. On September 18, 2006, Clear Channel changed the calls of the Coos Bay station to KMCB and moved the KUCW calls to channel 30 to coincide with the official launch of The CW. On November 16, Clear Channel announced that it would sell its television stations, including KUCW and KTVX, after being bought by private equity firms. On April 20, 2007, Clear Channel entered into an agreement to sell its entire television station group to Newport Television, a broadcast holding company operated by private equity firm Providence Equity Partners. The deal was finalized on March 14, 2008.

In May 2008, Newport agreed to sell KUCW and five other stations to High Plains Broadcasting due to an ownership conflict with Univision Communications (of which Providence Equity holds a 19% stake in, and already owned KUTH, channel 32). The sale closed on September 15, 2008. Newport retained control of the station via joint sales and shared services agreements. On October 12, 2009, KUCW announced that it had agreed to air Utah State University football as well as men's and women's basketball games. This agreement ran through the 2012–2013 academic year.

On July 19, 2012, Newport Television and High Plains Broadcasting reached a deal to sell 22 of their 27 stations to the Nexstar Broadcasting Group, Sinclair Broadcast Group and Cox Media Group. KUCW and KTVX were among the twelve that would be sold to Nexstar, which would acquire both stations outright since Nexstar does not currently hold a stake in any competing station in the market. The JSA and SSA between KTVX and KUCW was terminated when the transaction was completed on December 3, as both stations officially became co-owned for the first time since Clear Channel sold the pair back in 2008.

Sale to Nexstar Media Group
On December 3, 2018, Nexstar announced it would acquire the assets of Chicago-based Tribune Media—which has owned Fox affiliate KSTU (channel 13) since December 2013—for $6.4 billion in cash and debt. Nexstar is precluded from acquiring KSTU directly or indirectly, as FCC regulations prohibit common ownership of more than two stations in the same media market, or two or more of the four highest-rated stations in the market. (Furthermore, any attempt by Nexstar to assume the operations of KSTU through local marketing or shared services agreements may be subject to regulatory hurdles that could delay completion of the FCC and Justice Department's review and approval process for the acquisition.) As such, Nexstar will be required to sell either KSTU or KTVX to a separate, unrelated company to address the ownership conflict. (In the case of KSTU, reports preceding the purchase announcement stated that, as it did during the group's failed purchase by Sinclair, Fox Television Stations would seek to acquire certain Fox-affiliated stations owned by Tribune from the eventual buyer of that group. Also, as KUCW does not rank among the top four in total-day viewership and therefore is not in conflict with existing FCC in-market ownership rules, that station optionally can be retained by Nexstar regardless of whether it chooses to retain ownership of KTVX or sell KTVX in order to acquire KSTU or, should it be divested, be sold to the prospective buyer of KTVX.) On March 20, 2019, it was announced that Nexstar would keep the KTVX/KUCW duopoly and sell KSTU to the Cincinnati-based E. W. Scripps Company, marking Scripps' entry into Utah, as part of the company's sale of nineteen Nexstar- and Tribune-operated stations to Scripps and Tegna Inc. in separate deals worth $1.32 billion. The sale received FCC approval on September 16, 2019 and was ultimately consummated three days later.

KUWB intellectual unit history prior to the swap
The KUWB intellectual unit began on August 22, 1997 when ACME Communications agreed to acquire 49% ownership of Roberts Broadcasting of Salt Lake City, owners of unbuilt station KZAR-TV on analog channel 16 in Provo, with a second agreement to acquire the remaining 51% after the station commenced on-air operations. ACME was founded in 1997 and its stations were affiliated with The WB because its CEO and co-founder, Jamie Kellner, was its co-founder and had served as its CEO at that time. KZAR changed its call letters to KUWB in February 1998 and the intellectual unit moved over to UHF channel 30 in April 1998 when ACME Communications and Roberts Broadcasting (co-owners of channel 16) and Paxson Communications (owners of channel 30) agreed to allow each other to manage their stations leading up to the station swap which was completed in September 1999.

Programming
Syndicated programming on KUCW includes The King of Queens, The Big Bang Theory, Jerry Springer, Two and a Half Men, and Maury.

Occasionally as time permits, KUCW may air ABC network programs whenever KTVX is unable to in the event of extended breaking news coverage. The station also broadcasts NBC programming that the network's local affiliate, KSL-TV (channel 5), declines to air. The owner of that station, Bonneville International, is part of the media division of the Church of Jesus Christ of Latter-day Saints. A socially conservative religious organization, the LDS Church is known to refuse to air some of NBC's programming including the single-season sitcom The New Normal, the drama Hannibal and the short-lived series Coupling and The Playboy Club. From September 1995 to September 2013, KUCW also broadcast Saturday Night Live as KSL elected to run its popular local sports discussion and highlight program, SportsBeat Saturday, in the program's 10:30 p.m. timeslot instead; KSL began carrying SNL that fall.

Newscasts
KTVX began producing a two-hour extension of its weekday morning newscast Good Morning Utah (airing from 7 to 9 a.m.) and a half-hour 9 p.m. newscast for KUCW in September 2010. In addition, on September 7, KUCW began airing a local entertainment program each weekday morning at 9 a.m. called The Daily Dish (which has since been moved to KTVX and has now been converted into an hour-long midday newscast at 11:00 a.m.). The 9 p.m. newscast ended on December 9, 2011 due to low ratings, followed by the morning newscast's cancellation in 2012. A new 9 p.m. newscast, 9 at 9, launched on April 22, 2013.

Notable current on-air staff
 Brian Carlson – weeknights at 9:00 p.m.
 Don Hudson – weeknights at 9:00 p.m.

Technical information

Subchannels
The station's digital signal is multiplexed:

In April 2011, KUCW added The Country Network (later ZUUS Country) on digital subchannel 30.2.

On May 1, 2014, KUCW replaced ZUUS Country with Movies! on digital subchannel 30.2. ZUUS Country moved to 30.3.

On July 3, 2015, KUCW replaced ZUUS Country with Buzzr on digital subchannel 30.3.

On September 2, 2016, KUCW replaced Buzzr on digital subchannel 30.3 with Grit. Escape was also added to a new fourth subchannel.

On May 8, 2019, KUCW replaced Escape with Court TV on digital subchannel 30.4.

On September 1, 2021, KUCW replaced Grit with Quest on digital subchannel 30.3, and replaced Court TV with HSN on digital subchannel 30.4.

Analog-to-digital conversion
On April 3, 1997, the FCC adopted its Sixth Report and Order establishing digital television service allotments. In the initial allotment, the FCC assigned UHF channel 17 for KZAR-DT (the companion channel to UHF channel 16 in Provo) later to become KUWB-DT. In the station swap, the allocation for KUWB-DT was treated as part of the KUWB intellectual unit and became the companion channel for Ogden UHF channel 30 although channel 17 was still officially assigned to Provo in the Digital Table of Allotments. ACME Communications filed an application for KUWB-DT in November 1998. In July 1999, KUWB and seven other area channels, collectively known as DTV Utah, proposed significant changes to the Salt Lake City market DTV allocations which were approved by the FCC in May 2000.

As a result of the FCC ruling, KUWB-DT was reallocated from UHF channel 17 to channel 48 and its city of license officially moved from Provo to Ogden in the DTV Table of Allotments. The FCC granted a construction permit to build KUWB-DT in October 2001 and ACME Communications applied for a license for the DTV station six months later. The FCC granted the license for KUWB-DT (now KUCW-DT) on October 28, 2002. KUCW shut down its analog signal, over UHF channel 30, on June 12, 2009, as part of the federally mandated transition from analog to digital television. The station's digital signal remained on its pre-transition UHF channel 48, using PSIP to display KUCW's virtual channel as 30 on digital television receivers.

On September 9, 2018, KUCW moved its frequency, from digital channel 48 to digital channel 30.

Translators
KUCW is additionally rebroadcast over a network of low-power digital translator stations throughout Utah, plus parts of Idaho, Nevada, and Wyoming:

References

External links

UCW
The CW affiliates
Movies! affiliates
Quest (American TV network) affiliates
Mass media in Salt Lake City
Television channels and stations established in 1985
1985 establishments in Utah
Nexstar Media Group